Mitzpe Shalem is an Israeli settlement and former kibbutz in the eastern West Bank.

It was established in 1970 on land belonging to the Palestinian Bedouin village of ‘Ayn Trayba. The international community considers Israeli settlements in the West Bank illegal under international law, but the Israeli government disputes this.

History
The community was founded in 1970 as a Nahal settlement on land in the West Bank that Israel occupied in the 1967 Six-Day War. It was inhabited as a kibbutz in the Ihud HaKvutzot VeHaKibbutzim in 1976.

Today it has undergone privatization and is considered a cooperative community, thus no longer belonging to the Kibbutz Movement. It was named after Natan Shalem who investigated the Judean Desert, where the kibbutz is located.

Economy
The economy of the kibbutz depends on agriculture, tourism and industry. In agriculture, the kibbutz has an orchard of palm trees with an area of about 400 dunams and a coop for raising turkeys. Tourism used to include the Mineral Beach on the Dead Sea, with its sulfur-enhanced baths, and an organized swimming beach, now closed due to damage caused by sinkholes; and a motel named for the nearby Deragot Cliffs. The industry is derived from the manufacture of Ahava Skin Care products in the local company's laboratories. In September 2016 Ahava was sold to a Chinese conglomerate, but was not relocated and still offers working places to the community.

Ahava manufactures cosmetics based on minerals from the Dead Sea. A factory for refining these chemicals is located in the kibbutz. In 2009 a boycott campaign targeted the company for its activities in the West Bank. Protests were held in cosmetics stores in Israel and the United States. The Israeli human rights group B'tselem has said that exploitation of resources of occupied territory is prohibited by international law and has called on the Israeli government to end such practices.

References

External links

Kibbutzim
Kibbutz Movement
Populated places established in 1970
Israeli settlements in the West Bank
Nahal settlements
1970 establishments in the Israeli Military Governorate